"Vdol po Piterskoy" ( "Down the Peterskaya Road") is one of the best-known Russian folk songs.

Commentary

Historical background 

Vladimir Gilyarovsky, a Russian journalist and writer, devoted a chapter of his book Moscow and Muscovites to the song.

Some authors say that one ancient soldiers' song began with the same words ("Down the Petersky/"). Later that expression became a catchphrase meaning “to do something in plain sight” (to ride, to fly, etc.). Nikolai Dobronravov, a Russian poet, used the phrase in his song "You know what a guy he was" dedicated to Yuri Gagarin.

Settings and performance 
Some works of such composers as Tchaikovsky or Stravinsky contain themes based on «Vdol po Piterskoy».

The song was popularized by Feodor Chaliapin and by the Alexandrov Ensemble. It also appeared in the repertoires of Yuri Gulyayev, Leonid Kharitonov, Dmitri Hvorostovsky, Sergei Lemeshev, Vladimir Matorin, and Muslim Magomayev.

References

External links 
 
 Down the Petersky by Feodor Chaliapin (Hayes, 1924)

Feodor Chaliapin songs
Russian folk songs